Goody or goodie is an Irish dessert-like dish made by boiling bread in milk with sugar and spices. It is often given to children or older adults. This dish is eaten on St. John's Eve where it would be prepared near the bonfires lit to celebrate. A variation was prepared using milky tea to soak the bread. This dish is also prepared by parents to give to children when they have an upset stomach. Many children were given this during the 20th century as a treat in neighbours' houses or after school as a snack before dinner. It has nowadays been modified to suit the modern taste, by using cocoa powder and chocolate drops to sweeten.

See also
 List of Irish dishes

References

Irish cuisine
Bread puddings